Warnie Kępy (formerly  or Warnitzwiesen) is a Polish island in Szczecin Lagoon, near Wolin. Warnie Kępy is uninhabited and has been placed under natural protection due to its many animal species and nesting grounds, especially those of birds.

See also
List of islands of Poland

References

Uninhabited islands of Poland
Landforms of West Pomeranian Voivodeship